Wenceslaus I of Cieszyn (1413/18 – 1474), was a Duke of Cieszyn from 1431 (until 1442 with his brothers as co-rulers), Duke of half of Bytom during 1431–1452 (returned to him soon after until 1459) and Duke of Siewierz (until 1443).

He was the oldest son of Duke Bolesław I of Cieszyn by his second wife Euphemia, daughter of Duke Siemowit IV of Masovia.

Life
After the death of his father in 1431, and despite the fact that he was legally an adult and able to govern by himself, Wenceslaus remained under the tutelage of his mother, together with his younger brothers, who were his co-rulers.

Linked to the imperial court of Sigismund of Luxembourg, in 1438 Wenceslaus paid tribute to the Emperor. In the same year he obtained for Cieszyn the right of minting his own coins.

Despite the good relations with the Emperor Sigismund, in 1434 Wenceslaus was involved with the Hussites, helping especially the Burgrave of Będzin, Mikołaj Kornicz Siestrzeniec in his rallies against the Bishops of Kraków in the Kingdom of Poland. Only after a reprisal expedition of Krystyn Koziegłowski to Siewierz did Wenceslaus stop his support and conclude a settlement with Poland in Będzin on 15 October 1434.

On 17 February 1439, Wenceslaus married Elisabeth (b. 1 May/29 September 1403 - d. Legnica, 31 October 1449), daughter of Frederick I, Elector of Brandenburg and widow of Louis II, Duke of Brzeg-Legnica. According to the chronicler Ambrose of Byczyny, the wedding in fact took place two months before, on 9 December 1438 in Wrocław; however, after further research, historians believed that this date wasn't the proper marriage ceremony but only the engagement. Elisabeth is mentioned as Duchess of Cieszyn for the first time on 5 March 1439.

After six years of childless union, they were separated ca. 1445 for undisclosed reasons. Elisabeth returned to Legnica, where she died four years later, in 1449. Wenceslaus never remarried.

On 29 November 1442, Wenceslaus finally succumbed to the pressure of his brothers and agreed to the division of their lands. However, the newly created Duchies were unequal, because Wenceslaus retained in their hands most of the territories, giving to his brothers only half of both Głogów and Ścinawa (who were seriously in debt) and some parts of Cieszyn, and also retained the full authority over Bytom and Siewierz.

These actions, however, didn't resolve the financial difficulties of Wenceslaus. For this reason, on 24 December 1443 he sold the Duchy of Siewierz to Zbigniew Oleśnicki, Bishop of Kraków (and from them that land wasn't treated as part of Silesia). This step only provide liquidity to Wenceslaus for a while. The sale of Siewierz caused a long-lasting dispute between Wenceslaus and Duke Bolko V of Głogów, who didn't accept the transaction. Ultimately, the conflict was ended by 1 July 1457 when Wenceslaus entered into an agreement with Poland.

In 1452 he swapped Bytom for Bielsko with his brother Bolesław II. After Bolesław II's death later in that year, Wenceslaus took the guardianship of his children. This enabled him to re-acquire Bytom. In 1459, Wenceslaus sold Bytom to Duke Konrad IX of Oleśnica by the amount of 1,700 fines.

During the 1460s, the political activity of Wenceslaus was significantly limited. In 1468, the childless Duke abdicated in favor of his nephew Casimir II the rule over Cieszyn (although the real power was held by Wenceslaus's brother Przemysław II).

In 1471 Wenceslaus obtained the sole authority over Bielsko, after supported the candidacy of Władysław II as King of Bohemia.

Wenceslaus died in Bielsko in 1474. He is buried in the Dominican church in Cieszyn.

Ancestry

References 

Genealogical database by Herbert Stoyan
Genealogy of the Dukes of Cieszyn

|-

|-

|-

|-

|-

1413 births
1474 deaths
Dukes of Teschen
Piast dynasty